Tomáš Julínek (born 7 November 1956) is a Czech politician and physician. From 2006 to 2009, Julínek served as the Minister of Health of the Czech Republic. He is a member of the Civic Democratic Party.

Career
Julínek received his degree from Masaryk University in 1982. From 2003 to 2005, he worked on a reform of the health system of the Czech Republic. In September 2006, he was appointed Minister of Health of the Czech Republic replacing David Rath. Prime Minister Mirek Topolánek replaced him in January 2009 with Daniela Filipiová.

Notes

External links
 Home page of Tomáš Julínek

1956 births
Living people
Health ministers of the Czech Republic
Politicians from Brno
Civic Democratic Party (Czech Republic) Senators
Masaryk University alumni
Civic Democratic Party (Czech Republic) Government ministers
People from Brno in health professions